The 2020 Minnesota Senate election was held in the U.S. state of Minnesota on November 3, 2020, to elect members to the Senate of the 92nd Minnesota Legislature. A primary election was held in several districts on August 11, 2020. The election coincided with the election of the other house of the Legislature, the House of Representatives, and other elections.

Background
The last election in 2016 resulted in the Republican Party of Minnesota winning a majority of seats, after losing a majority to the Minnesota Democratic–Farmer–Labor Party (DFL) only four years earlier in the previous election in 2012. In conjunction with the result of the House election, it also resulted in the return of all-Republican control of the Legislature for the first time since 2012 and only the second time Republicans have had majorities in both houses since the return of partisan elections to the Senate in 1976. Control of the Senate has alternated between the Republicans and the DFL every election since 2010. All-Republican control of the Legislature ended when the DFL won a majority in the House in 2018.

A special election was held for District 11 on February 5, 2019, as a result of the resignation of incumbent DFL Senator Tony Lourey after he was selected to be the next commissioner of human services by Governor-elect Tim Walz in early January 2019. Republican State Representative Jason Rarick won the special election, increasing the Republican majority to 35 seats.

In October 2020, The Washington Post identified this state election as one of eight whose outcomes could affect partisan balance during post-census redistricting.

Electoral system
The 67 members of the Senate were elected from single-member districts via first-past-the-post voting for two-year terms. Contested nominations of recognized major parties (DFL, Grassroots-Legalize Cannabis, Legal Marijuana Now, and Republican) for each district were determined by an open primary election. Minor party candidates were nominated by petition. Write-in candidates must have filed a request with the secretary of state's office for votes for them to be counted. The filing period was from May 19 to June 2, 2020.

Retiring members

Republican 
 Paul Anderson, 44th
 Scott Jensen, 47th

DFL 
Carolyn Laine, 41st
Dick Cohen, 64th

Primary elections results 
A primary election was held on August 11 in 16 districts to nominate Republican and DFL candidates. Four Republican nominations and 13 DFL nominations were contested. Nine incumbents were opposed for their party's nomination. DFL incumbents Erik Simonson in District 7 and Jeff Hayden in District 62 were not renominated.

Predictions

Results

Close races
Districts where the margin of victory was under 10%:
District 14, 0.8% (gain)
District 34, 1.56%
District 26, 1.76%
District 25, 2.53%
District 27, 4.5% (gain)
District 38, 4.15%
District 37, 4.25%
District 54, 5.83%
District 39, 6.02%
District 56, 6.12% (gain)
District 33, 8%
District 53, 8.26%
District 58, 9.08% (gain)
District 4, 9.16%
District 3, 9.51%

District results

Seats changing parties

Post-election changes
On November 18, 2020, longtime DFL senators Thomas M. Bakk and David Tomassoni announced they would be leaving the DFL party and form their own "Independent Caucus" in the state senate. Majority Leader Paul Gazelka welcomed the move and promised to give both senators chairmanships on "prominent committees". This changes the senate composition to 34 Republicans, 31 Democrats, and two independents.

See also
 2020 Minnesota House of Representatives election
 2020 Minnesota elections
 2018 Minnesota gubernatorial election

Notes

References

Further reading
 . (About redistricting).

External links
 Elections & Voting - Minnesota Secretary of State

Minnesota Senate
Minnesota Senate
Minnesota Senate elections